Liam Kennedy may refer to:

 Liam Kennedy (academic), Irish academic, professor and director of the Clinton Institute for American Studies at University College Dublin
 Liam Kennedy (historian), Irish historian, emeritus professor of history at Queen's University Belfast